Gavin Le Sueur (born 1959) is a sailor, doctor and writer from Australia.

Medical career
He graduated from the University of Melbourne Medical School in 1984 with Bachelor of Medicine, Bachelor of Surgery and Bachelor of Medical Science degrees. In the early 2000s he operated from a medical clinic in the northern Australian town of Cairns.

Sports
Le Sueur has windsurfed solo 670 nautical miles from Melbourne to Sydney (1983) and land windsurfed 715 kilometers across the Nullarbor Plain (1985).
He is also a short-handed offshore multihull sailor. He was the best competitor in the 1988 trans-Tasman yacht race. In 1988 he was rescued with three other crew from the liferaft of the catamaran D-Flawless after the vessel hit a whale and was destroyed in rough weather offshore from Port Stephens. He competed against Sir Peter Blake in the 1988 Bicentennial Two Handed Around Australia yacht race. His co-skipper aboard the 40 ft Catamaran John West was Catherine Reed and Le Sueur proposed to her on the finish line of this 8000 nautical mile race. Le Sueur has cruised and raced many catamarans throughout the Indo-Pacific. In 2011 he capsized the  catamaran Top Gun/eDoc In 2013, Le Sueur crossed the Nullarbor Plain a second time by kite buggy and land surfing, accompanied by his family on land yachts.

Le Sueur has written and photographed for the magazines Multihull World and Cruising Helmsman. Since 1985 he has been the owner and director of Cyclone Publishers. From 1989 to 1992 he appeared on the Nine Network television series Australia from the outside looking in, hosted by Brian Naylor.

Personal life 
Le Sueur was married to Jennifer Schlager from 1983 to 1984. He has been married to Reed since 1990. He has three children: Estelle (born 1992), Baden (born 1997) and Fletcher (born 2002).

Books 
 Windswept (Cyclone Publishers)
 The Line (Cyclone Publishers)
 Multihull Seamanship Illustrated (John Wiley & Sons)
 Heavy Weather Sailing (Adlard Coles). (Multihull section.)
 Multihull Seamanship (Fernhurst Books)

References

External links 
 
 

1959 births
Living people
Australian general practitioners
Australian non-fiction writers
Australian photographers
Australian television personalities
Australian windsurfers
Australian male sailors (sport)
Magazine writers
University of Melbourne alumni